The Northeast Conference Women's Basketball Coach of the Year is a basketball award given to head coaches in the Northeast Conference (NEC). The award is granted to the head coach voted to be the most successful that season by the league's coaches. The award is named in honor of Brenda Reilly, a teacher, sports administrator and three-sport coach in a career of almost three decades at Central Connecticut State University.

The award was first given following the 1986–87 season, the first in which the NEC sponsored women's basketball. Kevin Jones of St. Francis Brooklyn was the inaugural recipient. The program with the most awards is Robert Morris, whose father-son duo of Sal and Charlie Buscaglia have garnered all of the Colonials' seven awards, but Robert Morris left the NEC for the Horizon League after the 2019–20 season. Among current NEC members, Mount St. Mary's has the most awards with six.

Winners

Winners by school

References

NCAA Division I women's basketball conference coaches of the year
Coach
Awards established in 1986